Stephanie Scuris (1931-2023) was a Greek-American artist and arts educator known for her large-scale Constructivist sculptures. She taught at the Rinehart School of Sculpture at the Maryland Institute College of Art in Baltimore, Maryland.

Early life
Scuris was born in Lacedaemonos, Greece,. She moved to the United States in 1947 at age 16, two years after the end of World War II. She studied under Josef Albers at Yale University, receiving a BFA and a MFA from the School of Art and Architecture in the late 1950s.

Career
Scuris was one of the select group of students Albers introduced to Madeleine and Arthur Lejwa at the Galerie Chalette. While still a student at Yale, she exhibited at their Structured Sculptures show of winter 1960.
She exhibited at the Whitney Museum of Art, MOMA, The Baltimore Museum of Art, and the Yale Art School, and worked on major commissions for the Bankers Trust Company and the Salk Laboratories in the 1960s.

She was recruited, along with Norman Carlberg, by the educator and artist Eugene Leake (both
alumni of the Yale/Albers MFA program), to revive the sculpture program at the Rinehart School at the Maryland Institute of Art. That revival was, by Scuris's account, "all about Bauhaus,” an educational approach that centered on knowledge of the physical manipulation of materials rather than strict figurative representation.

Selected exhibitions
 Recent Sculpture USA, Museum of Modern Art, New York, 1959
 Structured Sculpture, Galerie Chalette, New York, 1961 & 1968
 Geometric Abstraction in America, Whitney Museum of American Art, 1962
 Women Artists in America Today, Mt. Holyoke College, MA, 1962
 White on White, DeCordova Museum, Lincoln, MA, 1965
 Inside Outside, Smith College Museum of Art, Northampton, MA, 1966
 Josef Albers: His Art & Influence, Montclair Art Museum, NJ, 1981

Awards, permanent collections
Winterwitz Award, prize for outstanding work & alumni award, Yale Univ.; Peabody Award, 1961–62; Rinehart fellowship, 1961-64.

 Skedion Ecton, (1964) Whitney Museum of American Art, New York

References

1931 births
American people of Greek descent
Living people
Yale School of Art alumni
Maryland Institute College of Art faculty
Artists from Baltimore
Sculptors from Maryland
20th-century American sculptors
20th-century American women artists
21st-century American women artists
American women sculptors
Modern sculptors
American abstract artists
Abstract sculptors
American women academics